Salomon Jadassohn's String Quartet in C minor, Op. 10, is the composer's only work for the medium. Published in 1858, the quartet was dedicated to his teacher, Moritz Hauptmann.

Structure

The work is structured in four movements:

 Molto Allegro ed appassionato
 Adagio ma non troppo
 Allegretto un poco vivo
 Finale: Allegro ma non troppo - Presto

To date the quartet has not been recorded commercially.

External links

Jadassohn
1858 compositions
Compositions in C minor